The 1968 Whitewater State Warhawks football team represented Wisconsin State University—Whitewater—now known as the University of Wisconsin–Whitewater—as a member of the Wisconsin State University Conference (WSUC) during the 1968 NAIA football season. Led by 13th-year head coach Forrest Perkins, the Warhawks compiled an overall record of 6–3–1 with a conference mark of 5–3, tying for third place in the WSUC. Whitewater State opened the season at home on September 7 with a win over defending NAIA champion .

Schedule

References

Whitewater State
Wisconsin–Whitewater Warhawks football seasons
Whitewater State Warhawks football